Notable people named Justin Lester include:

Justin Lester (politician) (born 1978), a New Zealand politician
Justin Lester (wrestler) (born 1983), an American Greco-Roman wrestler